Wellawa Central College is a public school in Wellawa, Sri Lanka, established in 1918.

History

 Established in 1918, as missionary school.
 Welllawa Maha Vidyalaya became Wellawa Central Collegein 2002.

References

External links
Wellawa Central College website
Wellawa Central College Old Boys Association website
Wellawa Central College in facebook

Schools in Kurunegala